Liv Little (born Olivia Little) is the founder of gal-dem, an English online and print magazine run by women of colour. In 2016, she was listed as one of the BBC's 100 Women.

Life 

Little was born in January 1994 to a Jamaican-born father and mother of Guyanese descent. She was raised in South-East London and attended Blackheath High School and completed A-Levels at Newstead Wood School for Girls. During a year out between school and university she completed a 12-week placement in India as a Health and Livelihoods Coordinator with Restless Development, a branch within the International Citizen Service. She later studied Politics and Sociology at the University of Bristol, graduating in 2016 with First-Class Honours.

gal-dem 
Little founded gal-dem while at university after being frustrated with the lack of diversity at her university. The gal-dem team consists of more than 70 women of colour, most of whom are based in the UK but with others in countries around the world.

In 2016, to celebrate their first birthday, gal-dem produced the first print edition of the magazine. On 28 October 2016, the collective ran the Friday Late session at the V&A Museum. The session featured an all-female line-up, with activities ranging from a mass twerk workshop to the chance to hear the best female London MCs. Little stepped down from her role as the CEO of gal-dem in September 2020.

References 

1994 births
Living people
BBC 100 Women
Black British journalists
British journalists
English people of Guyanese descent
English people of Jamaican descent
British women journalists
Journalists from London
Alumni of the University of Bristol